The Open de France is a European Tour golf tournament. Inaugurated in 1906 it is the oldest national open in Continental Europe and has been part of the European Tour's schedule since the tour's inception in 1972. The 100th edition of the event was held in 2016. The 2022 edition will take place between 22 and 25 September on the Golf National course. There will be €3 million of prize fund. Last edition played was the 2019 tournament, won by Nicolas Colsaerts.

Originally played at La Boulie, the tournament has been hosted by many different venues, but since 1991, it has been held at the Le Golf National near Paris every year except for 1999 and 2001.

Since the turn of the millennium, the Fédération Française de Golf has made a concerted effort to enhance the stature of the event. In 2004 qualifying tournaments were introduced on the model of those for The Open Championship and the U.S. Open and were open to professionals and amateurs. The prize fund rose from €865,000 in 1999 to €4 million from 2006 to 2009, putting the Open de France in the top group of European Tour events (excluding the majors and the World Golf Championships, which are co-sanctioned by the U.S.-based PGA Tour). The prize fund was €3 million in 2015 and €3.5 million in 2016. It rose to US$7,000,000 in 2017 after joining the new Rolex Series. However the main sponsor of 2017 and 2018 editions: HNA decided to cancel its budget. In 2019, the tournament took place in October. Since then it has no longer been a Rolex Series event. From 2014 to 2018, it was one of the Open Qualifying Series events for The Open Championship with the leading three (four in 2016) players, who had not already qualified, qualifying for the Open. With a new sponsor for 2022 (Cazoo) the prize fund was €3,000,000.

Venues

From 1970 to 1973 the first two rounds were played on two different courses, everyone playing one round on each course. After the cut, one of the courses was then used for the final two rounds. In 1970 Chantaco and Biarritz-Le Phare were used, with the final two rounds played at Chantaco. In 1971 La Nivelle and Biarritz-Le Phare were used, with the final two rounds played at Biarritz-Le Phare. In 1972 La Nivelle and Biarritz-Le Phare were used, with the final two rounds played at La Nivelle. In 1973, two courses at La Boulie were used, La Foret and La Vallee, with the final two rounds played on La Vallee.

Winners

Sources:

References

External links

 
Coverage on the European Tour's official site

European Tour events
Golf tournaments in France
Recurring sporting events established in 1906
1906 establishments in France